This page includes a list of biblical proper names that start with N in English transcription. Some of the names are given with a proposed etymological meaning. For further information on the names included on the list, the reader may consult the sources listed below in the References and External Links.

A – B – C – D – E – F – G – H – I – J – K – L – M – N - O – P – Q – R – S – T – U – V – Y – Z

N 
Naam
Naaman, pleasantness
Naamah
Naarah
Naaran, juvenile, boyish, juvenile
Naashon
Naasson, enchanter
Nabal
Naboth
Nachon
Nachor
Nadab
Nagge
Nahaliel
Nahallal
Naham
Naharai
Nahash
Nahath
Nahbi
Nahor
Nahshon
Nahum
Nain
Naioth
Naomi
Naphish
Naphtali
Narcissus
Nathan
Nathanael
Nathan-melech
Naum
Nazareth
Nazarite
Neah
Neapolis
Neariah
Nebai
Nebaioth
Neballat
Nebat
Nebo
Nebuchadnezzar
Nebuzaradan
Necho
Nedabiah
Nehelamite
Nehemiah
Nehum
Nehushta
Nehushtan
Neiel
Nekoda
Nemuel
Nepheg
Nephilim
Nephish
Nephishesim
Nephthalim
Nephtoah
Nephusim
Ner
Nereus
Nergal
Nergal-sharezer
Neri
Neriah
Nethaneel
Nethaniah
Nethinim
Neziah
Nezib
Nibhaz, the barker 
Nibshan
Nicanor
Nicodemus
Nicolas
Nicolaitanes
Nicopolis
Niger
Nimrah
Nimrod
Nimshi
Nineveh
Nisan
Nisroch
No
Noadiah
Noah
Nob
Nobah
Nod
Nodab
Noe
Nogah
Noha
Non
Noph
Nophah
Norah
Nun
Nymphas

References
Comay, Joan, Who's Who in the Old Testament, Oxford University Press, 1971,  
Lockyer, Herbert, All the men of the Bible, Zondervan Publishing House (Grand Rapids, Michigan), 1958
Lockyer, Herbert, All the women of the Bible, Zondervan Publishing 1988, 
Lockyer, Herbert, All the Divine Names and Titles in the Bible, Zondervan Publishing 1988,  
Tischler, Nancy M., All things in the Bible: an encyclopedia of the biblical world , Greenwood Publishing, Westport, Conn. : 2006

Inline references 

N